The Foksal Gallery or Galeria Foksal is a non-commercial gallery space in Warsaw, Poland established in 1966, that shows works by contemporary avant-garde artists.

History
The Foksal Gallery was founded in 1966 by a group of Polish art critics and artists, which included one of the founder members of the Polish Constructivist Group of the 1920s. From the outset the gallery's activities were underpinned by the strong philosophical basis embodied within the essay "Wprowadzenie do ogolnej Teorii Miejsca (Introduction to the general Theory of Place)" (1966). The critics associated with the Foksal Gallery; Anka Ptaszkowska, Mariusz Tchorek, Wiesław Borowski established the gallery as a "place, a sudden gap in the utilitarian way of world comprehension", in which art could exist without reference to context or history, a place exempt from outside rules or influence. They also proposed that the venue, "as the most authentic theme of the event", was now to become the actual subject. In addition to the aforementioned critics, the artist-founders at the Foksal included Tadeusz Kantor,
Roman Owidzkiego, Edward Krasinski (whose signature blue Scotch tape intervention still winds its way through the gallery's ancillary spaces), Zbigniew Gostomski and Henryk Stażewski.

Zbigniew Gostomski (b. 1932), a founder artist of the Foksal Gallery, held the inaugural exhibition on 1 April 1966 showing works of his Optical Objects series. Tadeusz Kantor and Wlodzimierz Borowski were involved in actions at the gallery during the 60's.  The Foksal succeeded in showing work of an avant-garde nature throughout the communist era, apart from a short period of martial law, during which it was 'closed for renovation'. For its first twenty years the Foksal Gallery functioned within the state controlled system, nonetheless succeeding in developing an internationally significant programme of contemporary art under the Directorship of Wieslaw Borowski in co-operation with Andrzej Turowski. Milada Ślizińska also curated a series of exhibitions. Jaromir Jedlinski (previously of the Museum Sztuki in Łódź), was the gallery's Director from July 2006 until August 2008. Nowadays the gallery is run by the younger generation of curators: Katarzyna Krysiak (Artistic Director/Head Curator), Lech Stangret and Monika Weychert Waluszko.

The gallery acted under the auspices of the Laboratory of Arts Plastycznych (PSP) until 1982, then under SBWA until 2001. At present, it remains government funded under the Mazovia Region Centre For Culture and Art (MCKiS).

The Foksal Gallery has for many years been one of the most influential art galleries in Poland, with shows by many internationally acclaimed artists including Christian Boltanski, Henryk Stażewski, Joseph Beuys, Royden Rabinowitch, Anselm Kiefer, Luc Tuymans, Bill Viola, Tadeusz Kantor, Ian Hamilton Finlay, Koji Kamoji, Leon Tarasewicz, Douglas Gordon, Matthew Barney, Marek Chlanda and Victor Burgin  among many other notable names.

In 1997 the Foksal Gallery Foundation was formed to widen the scope of activities of the gallery. Initially based within the Foksal Gallery, the Foksal Gallery Foundation moved out in 2001 and now operates, somewhat controversially (because of the historic "Foksal" brand usage among others), as an independent and commercial entity, that has nothing to do with the Foksal Gallery activities whatsoever.

Name and Location
The gallery is named after Foksal, the name of the street at the end of which it can be found. 'Foksal' is said to be a Polish corruption of 'Vauxhall' the name given to the street when the Foksal park area was created in the nineteenth century by a merchant who had been inspired by the atmosphere of London's Vauxhall Pleasure Gardens in Vauxhall.

Artists
Artists shown at the gallery include:

Paweł Althamer
Giovanni Anselmo
Richard Ashrowan
Mirosław Bałka
Matthew Barney
Robert Barry
Johanna Bartl
Krzysztof M. Bednarski
Anna Beller
Jerzy Bereś
Joseph Beuys
Christian Boltanski
Włodzimierz Borowski
Daniel Buren
Victor Burgin
Alan Charlton
Marek Chlanda
Stanisław Cichowicz
Tomasz Ciecierski
Tony Cragg
Michael Craig-Martin
Jonas Dahlberg
Małgorzata Dawidek Gryglicka
Peter Downsbrough
Stanisław Dróżdż
Druga Grupa (Jacek Stokłosa, Lesław Janicki, Wacław Janicki)
Lars Englund
Diana Fiedler
Joel Fisher
Peter Flemming
Jarosław Fliciński
Tom Friedman
Wojciech Gilewicz
Douglas Gordon
Zbigniew Gostomski
Alexander Hahn
Alexander Hamilton
Ian Hamilton Finlay
John Hiliard
Susan Hiller
Alain Jacquet
Rafał Jakubowicz
Zuzanna Janin
Katarzyna Józefowicz
Koji Kamoji
Tadeusz Kantor
Niek Kemps
Anselm Kiefer
Job Koelewijn
Eustachy Kossakowski
Jarosław Kozłowski
Edward Krasiński
Piotr Lutyński
Dawid Mach
Robert Maciejuk
Tom Marioni
Angelika Markul
Ian McKeever
Annette Messager
Deimantas Narkevičius
Edward Narkiewicz
Anna Niesterowicz
Marzena Nowak
Jerzy Nowosielski
Roman Opałka
Achille Perilli
Peter Pommerer
Joanna Przybyła
Royden Rabinowitch
Arnulf Rainer
Wilhelm Sasnal
Jadwiga Sawicka
Gregor Schneider
Roman Signer
Roman Siwulak
Mikołaj Smoczyński
Maria Stangret Kantor
Henryk Stażewski
Gerda Steiner
((Marek Szczesny))
Andrzej Szewczyk
Leon Tarasewicz
Zygmunt Targowski
Tomasz Tatarczyk
Luc Tuymans
Piotr Uklański
Ben Vautier
Bernar Venet
Bill Viola
Lawrence Weiner
Franz West
Krzysztof Wodiczko
Włodzimierz Jan Zakrzewski
Artur Żmijewski

Notes

External links
Foksal Gallery /Galeria Foksal official web site
The Foksal Gallery Deposit, Centre for Contemporary Art, Ujazdowski Castle
Half a Century of the Foksal Gallery – Video

Art museums and galleries in Poland
Buildings and structures in Warsaw
Art galleries established in 1966
1966 establishments in Poland
Tourist attractions in Warsaw